The Rev. James Gibb (1857–1935) was born in Aberdeen, Scotland on 15 June 1857. He became part of the Presbyterian Church of New Zealand as it was formed (by unification in 1901) and founded several schools in Wellington, New Zealand during the 20th century, including Scots College, Wellington and Queen Margaret College. In 1909 he founded Presbyterian Support Central, a charity which provides support to residents of the southern North Island.

He moved to Dunedin in the 1880s after studying theology at Ormond College in Melbourne. As well as this, Gibb was ordained in 1883. Gibb became a minister of the First Church of Otago in 1886 and lobbied against the annexation of Vanuatu.

In 1903, Gibb became minister of St John's Church, Wellington. During this time he led lobbies against gambling, opium and adultery.

After the First World War Gibb became a pacifist and campaigned against war until his resignation from St John's in 1926.

Gibb died in Wellington on 24 October 1935.

References

External links
Presbyterian Support Central
Portrait - NZ National Library

New Zealand Presbyterian ministers
1857 births
1935 deaths
Clergy from Aberdeen
Scottish emigrants to New Zealand